Del Amo station is an elevated light rail station on the A Line of the Los Angeles Metro Rail system. The station is located between Compton Creek and Santa Fe Avenue, and elevated over the intersection of Del Amo Boulevard, after which the station is named, in the Los Angeles County community of Rancho Dominguez and near the city of Carson.

Del Amo station provides access to Dignity Health Sports Park (home stadium for the LA Galaxy of Major League Soccer) via the Galaxy Express shuttle operated by Long Beach Transit on game days during soccer season.

During the 2028 Summer Olympics, the station will serve spectators traveling to and from venues located at the Dignity Health Sports Park, site of the rugby, modern pentathalon, tennis, track cycling, and field hockey competitions.

Del Amo is the only elevated A Line station that was not originally built to handle three car trains. The northern end of the platform was lengthened in 2000.

The A Line maintenance and storage yard is located between the Wardlow and Del Amo stations.

Service

Station layout

Hours and frequency

Connections 
, the following connections are available:
Galaxy Express 
Los Angeles Metro Bus:

Notable places nearby 
 Del Amo Swap Meet
 Dignity Health Sports Park
 VELO Sports Center

References

A Line (Los Angeles Metro) stations
Railway stations in the United States opened in 1990
1990 establishments in California
Pacific Electric stations